The Social Democratic Group is a social democratic party group on the Nordic Council, making up the largest group on the Council. Their members come from all Nordic countries, and the Faroe Islands, Greenland and Åland. Their main aims are for sustainable development, tackling climate change, and reducing inequality, concomitant with a robust welfare system. They are strongly opposed to the privatization of state assets.

Members
The member organizations of the Social Democratic Group are:

In the European Parliament, the MEPs of the member parties are part of the Progressive Alliance of Socialists and Democrats parliamentary group.

Elected representatives of Member Parties

European institutions

See also
SAMAK

References

Pan-European political parties
Party of European Socialists
Social democratic parties in Europe
Scandinavian political parties
Party groups in the Nordic Council